The SIIMA Award for Best Film – Kannada is presented by Vibri media group as part of its annual South Indian International Movie Awards for Kannada films. The award was first given in 2012 for films released in 2011.

Winners

Nominations 

 2012: Katari Veera Surasundarangi – Munirathna
 Krantiveera Sangolli Rayanna – Ananda Appugola
 Anna Bond – Raghavendra Rajkumar
 Addhuri – CMR Shankar Reddy
 Drama – Jayanna, Bhogendra
2013: Myna – Omkar Movies / N. S. Rajkumar
 Bachchan – Sri Venkateshwara Krupa Entertainers / Uday Mehta
 Googly – Jayanna Combines / Jayanna-Bhogendra
 Shravani Subramanya – Suresh Arts / K A Suresh
 Bhajarangi – M Manjunath Gowda / R Nataraj Gowda
2014: Mr. and Mrs. Ramachari – Jayanna Combines
 Gajakesari – Jayanna Combines
 Ugramm – Inkfinite Pictures
 Oggarane – Prakash Raj Productions
 Drishya – E4 Entertainment

References 

South Indian International Movie Awards
Kannada-language films